Otherspace may refer to:
 Otherspace (novel), the third novel in David Stahler Jr.'s Truesight trilogy
 OtherSpace, an online text-based role-playing game created by Wes Platt
 Otherspace, or Todash space, a dimensionless void that is featured in the Stephen King works The Dark Tower and The Mist
 Other Space, a 2015 web series